Pyotr Yokimovich Marta (born 1952) is a retired Soviet freestyle wrestler. He was a European champion in 1977 and 1978 and placed third at the 1978 World Championships.

References 

1952 births
Living people
Soviet male sport wrestlers
World Wrestling Championships medalists